The University Hill Farms Historic District is located in Madison, Wisconsin.

History
What is now the district was developed in a collaboration between the University of Wisconsin and the City of Madison. The land that it was built on had previous been used by the university's agricultural school as an experimental farm. Among the houses in the district is one designed by Frank Lloyd Wright.

References

Historic districts on the National Register of Historic Places in Wisconsin
National Register of Historic Places in Madison, Wisconsin